Omorgus rubricans is a beetle of the family Trogidae.

References 

rubricans
Beetles described in 1946